The 2017–18 Taça da Liga was the eleventh edition of the Taça da Liga (also known as Taça CTT for sponsorship reasons), a football cup competition organised by the Liga Portuguesa de Futebol Profissional (LPFP) and contested exclusively by clubs competing in the top two professional tiers of Portuguese football. It began on 23 July 2017 and concluded on 27 January 2018 with the final at Estádio Municipal de Braga in Braga.

A total of 33 teams entered this tournament, including 18 teams from the 2017–18 Primeira Liga and 15 non-reserve teams from the 2017–18 LigaPro. The competition format suffered changes for a third consecutive season to accommodate a reduction in the number of participating teams, particularly from the LigaPro.

Moreirense were the title holders, beating 2012–13 winners Braga 1–0 in the previous final to win their first-ever title in a national competition, but were eliminated in the third round. In a repeat of the competition's first final held 10 years previously, Sporting defeated Vitória de Setúbal 5–4 on penalties (1–1 after ninety minutes) in the final to win the title for the first time in the club's history.

Format 
Fifteen teams competing in the 2017–18 LigaPro (reserve teams from Primeira Liga clubs are excluded) took part in the first round; one-legged ties were played between fourteen teams, with the fifteenth team receiving a bye to the next round.

In the second round, the eight teams advancing from the previous round (seven winners plus the team with a bye) were joined by the twelve teams placed 5th–16th in the 2016–17 Primeira Liga and by the two teams promoted to 2017–18 Primeira Liga. Again, one-legged ties were played between 20 teams, with two teams receiving a bye to the next round.

The third round featured the twelve teams advancing from the previous round (ten winners plus the two teams with a bye) and the four best-placed teams in the 2016–17 Primeira Liga. The sixteen teams are drawn into four groups that will be contested in a single round-robin format, with each team playing at least one game at home. The four group winners qualified for the semi-finals, which were played as single-legged ties. The semi-finals and final were played at a neutral venue.

Tiebreakers 
In the third round, teams are ranked according to points (3 points for a win, 1 point for a draw, 0 points for a loss). If two or more teams are tied on points on completion of the group matches, the following criteria are applied to determine the rankings:
highest goal difference in all group matches;
highest number of scored goals in all group matches;
lowest average age of all players fielded in all group matches (sum of the ages of all fielded players divided by the number of fielded players).

In all other rounds, teams tied at the end of regular time contest a penalty shootout to determine the winner.

Teams 
Thirty-three teams competing in the two professional tiers of Portuguese football for the 2017–18 season are eligible to participate in this competition. For Primeira Liga teams, the final position in the previous league season determined in which round they enter the competition.

Key
Nth: League position in the 2016–17 season
P1: Promoted to the Primeira Liga
P2: Promoted to the LigaPro
R1: Relegated to the LigaPro

Schedule 
All draws were held at the LPFP headquarters in Porto.

First round
The 15 non-reserve teams competing in the 2017–18 LigaPro entered the competition in this round. Fourteen teams were paired against each other for seven single-legged ties, while the fifteenth team (Real) was given a bye to the next round. The draw took place on 7 July 2017, and matches were played on 23 July 2017.

Second round
In the second round, the seven first-round winners and Real, who were given a bye to this round, joined the 12 teams ranked 5th–16th in the 2016–17 Primeira Liga and the two teams promoted from the 2015–16 LigaPro. Twenty teams were paired against each other for ten single-legged ties, while Feirense and Leixões were given a bye to the next round. 
The draw took place on 7 July 2017, and matches were played between 29 July 2017 and 3 September 2017.

Notes:

Third round
In the third round, the 10 second-round winners plus Feirense and Leixões, who were given a bye to this round, joined the four top-ranked teams from the 2016–17 Primeira Liga: Benfica (1st), Porto (2nd), Sporting CP (3rd) and Vitória de Guimarães (4th). These 16 teams were drawn into four groups of four, each group containing one of the four top-ranked Primeira Liga teams who each hosted their first two group matches. Group matches were played in a single round-robin format, ensuring that each team plays at least one match at home. The draw took place on 7 September 2017, and matches were played between 19 September and 30 December 2017.

Real, who had eliminated Belenenses in the previous round, were disqualified after it was determined that they fielded irregularly a punished player during their second-round match. As a result, Belenenses were repechaged and allocated into Group B, with Portimonense reallocated into Group A to occupy Real's vacancy.

Group A

Group B

Group C

Group D

Knockout phase
The knockout phase is contested as a final-four tournament by the four third-round group winners. The winners of Groups A and B play the winners of Groups C and D, respectively, in one-legged semi-finals, to determine the two finalist teams. All matches are being played at Estádio Municipal de Braga, in Braga, with the semi-finals played on 23 and 24 January, and the final scheduled for 27 January 2018.

Semi-finals

Final

References

External links
 LPFP page 

Taça da Liga
Taca da Liga
Taca da Liga